Adam Scott Glancy is an author and game designer known for co-developing Delta Green, as well as penning game settings, source books, short fiction, and essays related to the H.P. Lovecraft's Cthulhu mythos.

Career
Adam Scott Glancy, with John Scott Tynes and Dennis Detwiller, developed the Delta Green (1996) supplement to Call of Cthulhu for Pagan Publishing; they grew their setting further in 1999 with Delta Green: Countdown. On January 1, 2001, Tynes advised his partners that he was leaving the roleplaying industry, and Glancy became the president of Pagan Publishing. Eos Press published a d20 version of Delta Green (2007) with Glancy, and were able to use the Pagan Publishing trademark.

References

Living people
Place of birth missing (living people)
Role-playing game designers
Year of birth missing (living people)